Miroslav "Miro" Konôpka (born 21 January 1962) is a Slovakian racing driver who most recently competed in the FIA World Endurance Championship with his own team, ARC Bratislava.

Racing record

Racing career summary 

† As Konôpka was a guest driver, he was ineligible to score points.

Complete 24 Hours of Le Mans results

Complete FIA World Endurance Championship results 
(key) (Races in bold indicate pole position) (Races in italics indicate fastest lap)

References

External links 

 

1962 births
Living people
Slovak racing drivers
European Le Mans Series drivers
Asian Le Mans Series drivers
FIA World Endurance Championship drivers
24 Hours of Le Mans drivers
Euronova Racing drivers
Porsche Supercup drivers
FIA GT Championship drivers
American Le Mans Series drivers
24H Series drivers
Nürburgring 24 Hours drivers
Blancpain Endurance Series drivers
International GT Open drivers
Rolex Sports Car Series drivers
Sports car racing team owners
Sportspeople from Bratislava